Prinsen Geerligs is a Dutch surname and may refer to:
H.C. Prinsen Geerligs (1864–1953), Dutch chemist
Hugo Prinsen Geerligs (born 1973), Dutch bassist
Reina Prinsen Geerligs (1922–1943), Dutch resistance fighter

Compound surnames
Dutch-language surnames